Marc Laménie (born 11 July 1956) is a French politician and a member of the Senate of France. He represents the Ardennes department and is a member of the Union for a Popular Movement Party. He was elected on 26 August 2007, and was re-elected on 21 September 2008. He was mayor of Neuville-Day.

References
Page on the Senate website

1956 births
Living people
French Senators of the Fifth Republic
Union for a Popular Movement politicians
The Republicans (France) politicians
Senators of Ardennes (department)
Mayors of places in Grand Est